Cunuyo (possibly from Aymara khunu snow, uyu corral, "snow corral") is a mountain in the north of the Apolobamba mountain range on the border of Bolivia and Peru. On the Bolivian side it is located in the La Paz Department, Franz Tamayo Province, Pelechuco Municipality, and on the Peruvian side it lies in the Puno Region, Putina Province, Sina District. Cunuyo is situated southwest of the mountain Locopauchenta and east of Losojocha.

Cunuyo is also the name of a river which originates near the mountain. It flows to the northeast.

References 

Mountains of La Paz Department (Bolivia)
Mountains of Puno Region
International mountains of South America
Bolivia–Peru border
Mountains of Peru